Many films since the 1980s and earlier have featured mid- and post-credits scenes, also known as credit cookies. Such scenes often include comedic gags, plot revelations, outtakes, and/or hints about sequels.

Pre-1980s

1980s

1990s

2000s

2010s

2020s

Notes

References 

Lists of films
Film scenes